The PMZ-A-750 (Russian: ПМЗ-А-750) was a pre-World War II heavy motorcycle produced in the USSR by the PMZ factory.

History

The PMZ-A-750 was the first heavy motorcycle manufactured in the Soviet Union. It was designed in the early 1930s in the NATI (Scientific Auto & Tractor Institute) in Moscow, at the request of the Supreme Soviet of the National Economy. A main designer was Pyotr Mozharov, who had been responsible for early IZh motorcycle prototypes, and practised in the German BMW works. The new motorcycle was initially designated NATI-A-750, and like Harley-Davidson motorcycles had a V-twin engine.

It was initially planned to produce the motorcycle in IZh works in Izhevsk, and the first four were built there, completed by 1 May 1933. After trials, the Soviet Heavy Industry Ministry decided to start production at Podol'skiy Mekhanicheskiy Zavod (Podolsk Mechanical Works) in Podolsk, which had not manufactured motorcycles before. By July 1934, the first nine motorcycles were built there. Production lasted until 1938, (other information: 1939) and approximately 4,600 were built in total.

These motorcycles were used by the Red Army as well as civilian users, in both solo and sidecar combination versions.

References

World War II vehicles of the Soviet Union
Motorcycles powered by V engines

Motorcycles introduced in the 1930s
Motorcycles of Russia